Lidija Kuliš (born 2 May 1992) is a Bosnian football striker who plays for Italian club A.C. Milan. She previously played for Germany's Turbine Potsdam. She signed for Turbine in summer 2011 and scored in her first match with the team. Kuliš previously played for Bosnian champions SFK Sarajevo, participating in three Champions League campaigns despite her young age.

In 2008, at 16, she was named female player of the year at Idol Nacije.

Kuliš left Potsdam on a loan transfer to Damallsvenskan club Linköpings FC in March 2013. She had played most of her football for Potsdam's second team in Germany, scoring 22 goals. Linköpings were in the market for a forward because Linda Sällström had suffered an anterior cruciate ligament injury.

In July 2018, Kuliš signed for Scottish champions Glasgow City.

References

External links
 

1992 births
Living people
Bosnia and Herzegovina expatriate women's footballers
People from Visoko
1. FFC Turbine Potsdam players
Expatriate women's footballers in Germany
Expatriate women's footballers in Sweden
Damallsvenskan players
Linköpings FC players
Women's association football forwards
Bosnia and Herzegovina women's international footballers
Glasgow City F.C. players
Expatriate women's footballers in Scotland
Frauen-Bundesliga players
1. FC Köln (women) players
Expatriate women's footballers in Italy
Serie A (women's football) players
A.C. Milan Women players
Bosnia and Herzegovina expatriate sportspeople in Italy
Bosnia and Herzegovina expatriate sportspeople in Germany
Bosnia and Herzegovina expatriate sportspeople in Scotland
Bosnia and Herzegovina expatriate sportspeople in Sweden
Scottish Women's Premier League players
Bosnia and Herzegovina women's footballers